Lower Horse is a  uninhabited island off the English coast, lying in the Thames Estuary between Canvey Island and Stanford-le-Hope, close to .

Ownership and size
It is part of Thurrock unitary authority; an internal border of its historical and ceremonial county Essex, namely of the administrative county of Essex is between it and Canvey Island. 

Within, smaller than normal marks for a patch of saltings (traditional, open air, sea salt extraction through drying) feature in the leading map of 1919, which confirms the island's acreage.

Geography
Consisting of permanent marshland with six small internal creeks draining to the north; Lower Horse is part of the group of islands (five of which later re-clustered to form Canvey Island), that broke away from the English coastline in the medieval period.

See also
Islands in the River Thames

References

External links 

 Map showing location of Lower Horse

Islands of Essex
Islands of the River Thames
Thurrock
Uninhabited islands of England